KFF Apolonia is an Albanian women's football club based in Fier. They compete in the Albanian women's football championship.

References 

Football clubs in Albania
Apolonia